This partial list of city nicknames in Indiana compiles the aliases, sobriquets and slogans that cities and towns in Indiana are known by (or have been known by historically), officially and unofficially, to municipal governments, local people, outsiders or their tourism boards or chambers of commerce. City nicknames can help in establishing a civic identity, helping outsiders recognize a community or attracting people to a community because of its nickname; promote civic pride; and build community unity. Nicknames and slogans that successfully create a new community "ideology or myth" are also believed to have economic value. Their economic value is difficult to measure, but there are anecdotal reports of cities that have achieved substantial economic benefits by "branding" themselves by adopting new slogans.

Some unofficial nicknames are positive, while others are derisive. The unofficial nicknames listed here have been in use for a long time or have gained wide currency.
 Albion – Gateway to the Chain O' Lakes
 Auburn - Home of the Classics
Bedford – Stoner City
Bloomington
B-Town
University City
Bluffton
Asphalt City
Parlor City
Carmel – Roundabout Capital of the World
Chesterton – Gateway to the Dunes
Churubusco – Turtle Town, U.S.A.
Clay City – Mayberry of the Midwest
Columbus – Athens of the PrairieU.S. City Monikers, Tagline Guru website, accessed January 5, 2008
Crawfordsville – Athens of Indiana
Elkhart
 City of Musical Doings
 RV Capital of the World
Elwood – Gem City of the Gas Belt or Buckle of the Gas Belt
Evansville
Crescent City
Pocket CityCatherine Traylor Gregory, Evansville, Indiana Business Magazine, Sunday, June 1, 1997. Nickname refers to city's location on "a horseshoe-shaped section of the Ohio River."
River City
Stoplight City
Heavensville
Evansvegas
Fort Wayne
City of Churches
City That Saved Itself
Magnet Wire Capital of the World
Summit City
Gary
City of the Century
Magic City
Steel City
Goshen – Maple City
Greensburg – Tree City
Huntington – Lime City
Indianapolis
Amateur Sports Capital of the World
Circle City
Crossroads of America
Indy
India-no-place
Naptown
Railroad City
Jeffersonville – Jeff
Kokomo – City of Firsts
LaFayette - Star City
La Porte
City of Lakes
Maple City
Logansport
 City of Bridges
 City of Churches
Marion – Queen City or Queen City of the Gas Belt
Martinsville
 City of Mineral Water
 Goldfish Capitol of the World
Medaryville 
Tatertown
Mudville
Mishawaka
Peppermint Capital of the World
Princess City
Muncie
Funcie
 Middletown
 Little Chicago
Peru
 Barbecue City
 Circus Capital of the World
Richmond
 Quaker City of the West
 Rose City
Rockville – Covered Bridge Capital of the World
Roselawn – Naked City
South Bend
 Lotion City
 Metropolis of Northern Indiana
 Wagon City
Speedway – Racing Capital of the World
Terre Haute
Queen City of the Wabash
Crossroads of America (National Road/U.S. Route 40 and Dixie Bee Rd/U.S. Route 41 met in downtown)
Prairie City (eastern edge of the Great Plains/prairies)
Pittsburgh of the West (historical: city was an early steel center)
Valparaiso
Vale of Paradise
Valpo
Van Buren – Popcorn Capital of the World
Vincennes – Indiana's First City
Warsaw
Lake City
Orthopedic Capital of the World

See also
List of city nicknames in the United States
List of cities in Indiana

References

External links
a list of American and a few Canadian nicknames
U.S. cities list

Indiana cities
Populated places in Indiana